Gothenburg Roller Derby (GBGRD) is a women's flat track roller derby league based in Gothenburg in Sweden. Founded in 2009, the league consists of one travel team- Aqwarriors - and close to 100 members, and is a member of the Women's Flat Track Derby Association (WFTDA).

History
The league was founded in 2009.  In July 2013, it hosted the roller derby section of the SM-veckan national sporting competition, taking fourth place in the Swedish championships.

In April 2013, Gothenburg was accepted as a member of the Women's Flat Track Derby Association Apprentice Program. Gothenburg became a full member of the WFTDA in March 2015.

In July 2014, GBGRD again reached the semifinals in the Swedish championships in roller derby.

References

Sports competitions in Gothenburg
Roller derby leagues established in 2009
Roller derby leagues in Sweden
2009 establishments in Sweden